The Regius Professorship of Engineering is a professorship at the University of Cambridge, established in 2011. The Regius professorship was created by the University, with the permission of the Queen, to commemorate the end of the Duke of Edinburgh's 34-year tenure as Chancellor. The professorship has been held by a single incumbent, David J. C. MacKay, from its creation until his death in 2016.

Regius Professors of Engineering 

 David J. C. MacKay (2013–2016)

References 

Engineering education in the United Kingdom
Engineering, Regius
School of Technology, University of Cambridge
Engineering, Regius, Cambridge
2011 establishments in England
Engineering, Cambridge